Harand (also known as Hājiābād) is a city and capital of Jolgeh District, in Isfahan County, Isfahan Province, Iran. At the 2006 census, its population was 6,613, in 1,856 families.

References

Populated places in Isfahan County

Cities in Isfahan Province